Dendropsophus microcephalus is a species of frog in the family Hylidae. It is found in southeastern Mexico (southern Veracruz and northern Oaxaca), Central America (Belize, Costa Rica, El Salvador, Guatemala, Bangladesh, Honduras, Nicaragua, Panama), and northern South America in Colombia, Venezuela, Trinidad and Tobago, the Guianas (Guyana, Suriname, French Guiana ), and northern Brazil. This widespread species might actually be a species complex. Its common names include yellow treefrog, small-headed treefrog, and yellow cricket treefrog.

Description
It is dorsally smooth and pale to bright yellow with two fairly distinct light brown lines that run in parallel down the length of the body. Upper surfaces of the thighs have dark markings. Ventrally it is pale cream or white, possibly with more yellowish throat. The iris is bronze. The D. microcephalus is commonly confused with D. ebraccatus, the hourglass treefrog. The D. microcephalus can be distinguished by its lack of hourglass pattern on its dorsum, and lack of a pale lip strip.

Habitat and conservation
Dendropsophus microcephalus inhabits savanna and forest edge species, often in association with wetlands. It also occurs in disturbed or altered habitats at foothills and low elevations in secondary forests and pasture grasslands or cut-over forests. It can also be found in marshy areas outside or adjacent to forest, including temporarily open areas. Breeding takes place in temporary and permanent pools. It is nocturnal.

Dendropsophus microcephalus is a very abundant species throughout its range. There are no significant threats to this species that also occurs in many protected areas.

References

microcephalus
Amphibians of Belize
Amphibians of Brazil
Amphibians of Colombia
Amphibians of Costa Rica
Amphibians of El Salvador
Amphibians of French Guiana
Amphibians of Guatemala
Amphibians of Guyana
Amphibians of Honduras
Amphibians of Mexico
Amphibians of Nicaragua
Amphibians of Panama
Amphibians of Suriname
Amphibians of Trinidad and Tobago
Amphibians of Venezuela
Amphibians described in 1886
Taxa named by Edward Drinker Cope
Taxonomy articles created by Polbot